Mount Carmel College is a Roman Catholic co-educational secondary school located in the Adelaide suburb of Rosewater, South Australia. It was established in 1909 by the Sisters of St Joseph, at the primary school location. Mount Carmel Girls School was co-located with the primary school. The Newcastle Street site was Marist Boys Alberton, also called Mount Carmel Boys School and it was a all-boys school until December 1966. In February 1967 the Sisters of St Joseph transferred the all-girls school from the Pennington Terrace School to the present site of Mount Carmel College and in 1983 the school became a co-educational institution.

Principals
This is a list of all the previous principals of Mount Carmel College from 1967 to the present.
1967-1968	— Sr Charlotte
1969-1971	— Sr Teresita Cormack
1972-1976	— Sr Joan Evans
1977-1980	— Sr Jude Dundon
1981-1988	— Sr Joan Barry
1989-1993	— Mr Peter Daw
1994-1995	— Mr Tony Lowes
1996-2005	— Sr Josephine Dubiel
2006–2011	— Mrs Jane Iwanowitsch
2012–2016	— Mr Gavin McGlaughlin
2017-current   — Mr John Konopka

Developments
Recent building projects and work on the school include:

1992: Mary MacKillop Special Education Unit completed
1995: Environmental Studies building refurbished and Land acquisition program approved
1997: Physical Education Laboratory, Science Laboratory, Tutorial and Study Room built
1998: Canteen, Undercroft, Year 11 classrooms built and all transportable buildings removed
1999: Air conditioning completed
2001: Staff Car Park, Lawn and Hard play area next to Year 8 rooms established
2002: Federation Garden extended and Courts resurfaced
2006: Staff prep area extended, new transportable classrooms erected
2007: Two further transportables erected
2008: Even more transportable buildings erected - this time in the Federation Garden
2013: Marist Hall demolished
2014: Rosewater Trade Training Centre commenced in semester 2
2018-2019 (end Term 1): Sacred Heart Centre constructed
2019: Year 7 students commence at the secondary school
2022: Mount Carmel College became R-12, after unification with Mount Carmel Primary School (also known as Our Lady of Mount Carmel Parish School in the latter years)
2022: Western Technical College the new name for Rosewater Trade Training Centre, after some state government funding to expand the centre for vital new trades re submarine and marine projects

Cervical cancer vaccine
Girls at Mount Carmel College were the first to receive the new Australian-made Cervical Cancer Vaccine on 2 April 2007. The vaccine prevents over 70% of cervical cancers. Australia's former Minister for Health and Ageing, Tony Abbott, was present to launch the vaccination programme.

References

Catholic secondary schools in Adelaide
Educational institutions established in 1927
1927 establishments in Australia